Aviva plc is a British multinational insurance company headquartered in London, England. It has about 18 million customers across its core markets of the United Kingdom, Ireland and Canada. In the United Kingdom, Aviva is the largest general insurer and a leading life and pensions provider. Aviva is also the second largest general insurer in Canada.

Aviva also has a focus on the growth markets of China and South East Asia through investments and joint ventures with other firms. Aviva has a primary listing on the London Stock Exchange, and is a constituent of the FTSE 100 Index.

Name
The name of the company upon its formation in May 2000 was CGNU plc and was created when Norwich Union merged with insurer CGU. In April 2002, the company's shareholders voted to change the company name to Aviva plc, an invented palindrome word derived from "viva", the Latin for 'alive' and designed to be short, memorable and work worldwide. The Norwich Union brand, however, was retained for the UK long-term savings and general insurance business.

In April 2008, Aviva announced that it would adopt the Aviva name as its worldwide consumer facing brand, and that the Norwich Union brand would be phased out in the United Kingdom.

History
Aviva can trace its history back to the establishment of the Hand in Hand Fire & Life Insurance Society in London in 1696.

It was created by a merger of two British insurance firms, Norwich Union and CGU plc (itself created by the merger of 1998 of Commercial Union and General Accident) as CGNU in February 2000. The Aviva name was adopted in July 2002. Thereafter, most of the group operations, except for some strong local brands, were carried out under the uniform brand "Aviva".

In 2002, Aviva purchased Abeille Vie, a French life insurance company.

In March 2005, Aviva acquired the RAC plc breakdown recovery operation for around £1.1 billion.

In July 2006, Aviva greatly increased its presence in the United States by acquiring AmerUs Group, a Des Moines based financial services company founded in 1896 in a $2.9 billion (£1.6 billion) deal.

The launch was supported by a £9 million advertising campaign to promote the rebranding (one of the most expensive ever in the insurance field), with the participation of celebrities including Bruce Willis and Alice Cooper. In June 2009, the company decided to dispose of Navigator, its Australian wealth management business, to National Australia Bank for A$825 million (£401 million).

In October 2009, the company decided to focus on its commercial insurance sector and demonstrate its commitment to brokers by launching their 'find a broker' facility, using the British Insurance Brokers Association search engine. To help them with this endeavour, Paul Whitehouse was recruited to play the part of a successful hairdresser running three salons. The message of the campaign focused on business insurance through insurance brokers.

In September 2011, Aviva completed the sale of RAC plc breakdown recovery operation for £1.0 billion to The Carlyle Group. In February 2012, Aviva sold its occupational health business to the British support services company Capita.

In July 2012, Aviva announced plans to sell or close 16 non core businesses in order to simplify its activities and boost shareholder returns. As part of the plans Aviva announced the sale of its operations in South Korea and the closure to new business of its bulk buying annuity unit in the United Kingdom. In August 2012, Aviva announced that up to 800 jobs would be lost, following a reorganization caused by further turmoil in the Eurozone.

In December 2012, Aviva agreed to sell Aviva USA Corporation to Athene Holding for US$1.8 billion (£1.1 billion) as part of a plan to improve shareholder returns and reduce the group's capital requirements, having paid $2.9 billion in 2006 and incurring a large loss on sale. Athene subsequently sold the life insurance business of Aviva to Global Atlantic.

On 13 April 2015, Aviva completed the £5.6 billion all share takeover of Friends Life Group. Andy Briggs, then group chief executive of Friends Life, became CEO of Aviva UK Life, with Mark Wilson continuing as CEO of the enlarged Aviva Group. In July 2016, Aviva froze withdrawals from the Aviva Investors Property Trust because of a lack of liquidity after Britain's vote to leave the European Union on 23 June. In September 2017, Aviva agreed to sell its Italian joint venture Avipop Assicurazioni to Banco BPM for US$312.01 million (€265 million).

In March 2018, Aviva, controversially, announced that it "had the ability" to cancel its irredeemable preference shares at par. This caused a wider sell off in the preference share market in the United Kingdom. Also in March 2018 the company announced to spend around £600 million on so called "bolt on" acquisitions, that are in "Poland, Turkey, anywhere we have existing markets".

In October 2018, Mark Wilson agreed to step down as CEO with immediate effect, with Adrian Montague taking interim control of the company, pending Wilson's formal departure in 2019. Maurice Tulloch was appointed CEO in March 2019; however, he stood down in July 2020 for family health reasons and was replaced by Amanda Blanc, who previously served as an Independent Non-Executive Director of the company.

In November 2020, Avivia sold its stake in their Indonesian company Astra Aviva Life and their Hong Kong division.

In 2021, Aviva sold its French operations to Aéma Groupe. As part of the deal, Aviva agreed to indemnify Aéma against potential legal liabilities to Max-Hervé George. In May, Aviva completed the sale of its Turkish business, followed by businesses in Italy (Aviva Italia Holding) and Poland in December 2021.

Operations

Aviva's main activities are the provision of general and life insurance, long term savings products and fund management services. The group has around 31,000 employees and 18 million customers. Aviva Investors has £263 billion assets under management.

Principal subsidiaries

United Kingdom
 Aviva Life – Pensions, investments, life insurance and long term savings (formerly Norwich Union)
 Aviva Insurance – General Insurance (including the Quotemehappy brand)
 Aviva Investors – Fund Management ''(formerly Morley)
Canada – Aviva Canada
China – Aviva-Cofco
India – Aviva India
Ireland
Aviva Direct
Aviva Health

Following the completion of Friends Life Group Limited in April 2015, Friends Provident International Limited is now part of the Aviva Group.

Senior management
CEO Richard Harvey retired on 11 July 2007. His successor was Andrew Moss, the former group finance director. Moss was paid an annual base salary of £925,000 for his role as Chief Executive. Moss resigned on 8 May 2012, after shareholders voted down a proposed senior management pay deal which would have seen Moss increase his basic pay by 5% despite several years of Aviva underperformance.

Following the departure of Aviva's CEO, Andrew Moss, McFarlane assumed the role of executive deputy chairman and became executive chairman on 1 July 2012. On 20 November 2012, Aviva announced that Mark Wilson had been appointed CEO, starting 1 January 2013.

On 12 September 2014, Aviva announced that Sir Adrian Montague would become non executive chairman, on the retirement of John McFarlane at the Aviva AGM in April 2015. On 9 October 2018, the Aviva Board announced Mark Wilson was to step down, remaining as part of the company until April 2019 though on garden leave; with Sir Adrian Montague assuming executive responsibilities in the interim whilst a replacement candidate is sought. Maurice Tulloch was appointed CEO in March 2019; however, he stood down in July 2020 for family health reasons and was replaced by Amanda Blanc, who previously served as an Independent Non-Executive Director of the company.
Jason Windsor was announced as chief financial officer in September 2019.

George Culmer took over as chairman from Sir Adrian Montague on 27 May 2020.

Sponsorships
In May 2008, Aviva became Norwich City Football Club's main sponsor. In an advert from 2009 starring Paul Whitehouse, they feature a Plymouth Argyle F.C. fan who uses Aviva car insurance, followed by a Green Army chant. It also acquired the naming rights for the redeveloped Lansdowne Road stadium in Dublin, Ireland, which was renamed the Aviva Stadium. In January 2018, the naming rights were extended to 2025.

Aviva sponsored rugby union's English Premiership from 2010 to 2018.

References

External links

Aviva plc Official site

 
Financial services companies established in 2000
Companies listed on the London Stock Exchange
Companies formerly listed on the New York Stock Exchange
Financial services companies based in the City of London
Multinational companies based in the City of London
British brands